Alexandra Gottardo is an Indonesian model, film and television actress.

Career
Gottardo was born on 5 January 1985, in Malang, Indonesia to Italian architect Carlo Gottardo and his Indonesian wife Banik Ekawati. Her father died when she was a child and she was brought up by her mother. After finishing her schooling, Gottardo went to Jakarta for better career prospects. It was here that she was cast for TV serials like Karena Cinta and Si Yoyo (2006). The latter show brought her recognition.

In 2010 she played the lead role in -directed drama , set against the backdrop of the 1999 East Timorese crisis. Her performance as a widowed mother garnered her two nominations at the 2011 Indonesian Movie Awards. She also shared the 2011 's Best Female Lead Award with Acha Septriasa (for Love Story) and won the Best Actress award at the  2010.

She re-teamed with director Sihasale for the 2013 film . The nest year, she played an important role in sinetron (soap opera)  (CHSI). She has been the brand ambassador for Earth Hour movement. She also has a wedding planning business in Bali and a dance school in South Jakarta.

Personal life
During the night of 5 March 2012, two robbers broke into Gottardo's house, and forced her at knife-point to withdraw a reported Rp 7.9 million from a nearby Bank Central Asia ATM. Both of the perpetrators were arrested later that same night. Following the incident, she hired two bodyguards. Gottardo married Arief Utama Waworuntu on 22 January 2016 in a Malang, East Java, and together they have a daughter, Charleteana Eleanore.

Filmography
 Anak-Anak Borobudur (2007)
 Medley (2007)
  (2008)
  (2010)
  (2013)
  (2016)
 Pinky Promise (2016)

References

External links
 

1985 births
Living people
Indo people
Javanese people
Indonesian film actresses
Indonesian television actresses
Indonesian people of Italian descent
People from Malang